The angle shades (Phlogophora meticulosa) is a moth of the family Noctuidae. The species was first described by Carl Linnaeus in his 1758 10th edition of Systema Naturae. It is distributed throughout Europe as far east as the Urals and also in the Azores, in Algeria, and in Asia Minor, Armenia, and Syria. It is strongly migratory.

Description
This species has a wingspan of 45–52 mm and the forewings are very distinctively shaped with a sharply pointed apex. Despite this bright colouring, the angular markings provide excellent disruptive patterning camouflage. The hindwings are whitish with darker venation.

Technical description and variation

It has a wingspan of 45–52 mm. Forewing whitish ochreous, the base and costal area extensively pinkish; a triangular space on inner margin before the inner line, the terminal area beyond submarginal line, and a costal shade beyond outer line olive greenish; central area dark green, pinkish towards costa, triangular in shape, the blunt apex resting on inner margin; the three stigmata more or less rosy green, the two upper with pale lateral edges; outer line double and angled outwards on vein 5; submarginal line preceded by a blackish-green lunule between veins 6 and 7; fringe rufous green, blackish along the excision below vein 4; hindwing pale ochreous, with the discal spot, veins, and often the whole inner half tinged with greenish fuscous; dark outer and double submarginal lines, the latter often forming a grey band below vein 4; ab. roseobrunnea ab. nov [Warren] from São Jorge Island in the Azores, has the central triangle rich red brown tinged with fulvous, the whole wing reddish tinged, and the green shades all strongly mixed with reddish, the metathorax and dorsal tufts also being deep fulvous instead of green.

Biology
This moth flies mainly at night and is attracted to light and sugar. It may often be seen during the day at rest on fences and garden foliage.

The larva is dull green or pinkish brown, thickly dotted with pale; dorsal line whitish, interrupted;
lateral lines narrowly whitish; segments 4—11 with oblique darker lateral stripes. The larva is green or brown with reddish spots along the sides and faint dark chevrons along the back. It feeds on a wide variety of plants (see list below). This species overwinters as a larva.

There is a similar related moth called the small angle shades, Euplexia lucipara.

Recorded food plants

Aeonium
Anemone
Apium – celery
Basil
Beta – beet
Betula – birch
Brassica
Broccoli
Centranthus – red valerian
Chrysanthemum
Cynara – globe artichoke
Dahlia
Fragaria – strawberry
Geranium
Hedera – ivy
Helianthus – sunflower
Humulus – hop
Lactuca – lettuce
Lamium – deadnettle
Malus – apple
Nicotiana – tobacco
Pelargonium
Prunus
Pyrus – pear
Quercus – oak
Rubus – bramble
Rumex – dock
Senecio
Solanum
Spinacia – spinach
Stellaria
Urtica – nettle
Vicia
Vitis – grape
Mentha - mint

See Robinson, G. S. et al.

References

Chinery, Michael Collins Guide to the Insects of Britain and Western Europe, 1986 (Reprinted 1991)
Skinner, Bernard Colour Identification Guide to Moths of the British Isles, 1984

External links

 Taxonomy
Lepiforum e.V.

Noctuinae
Moths described in 1758
Moths of Asia
Moths of Europe
Moths of Iceland
Moths of the Middle East
Taxa named by Carl Linnaeus